Florida Bay is the bay located between the southern end of the Florida mainland (the Florida Everglades) and the Florida Keys in the United States. It is a large, shallow estuary that while connected to the Gulf of Mexico, has limited exchange of water due to various shallow mudbanks covered with seagrass. The banks separate the bay into basins, each with its own unique physical characteristics.

Description
Nearly all of Florida Bay is included in Everglades National Park. The southern edge, along the Florida Keys, is in the Florida Keys National Marine Sanctuary. The bay muds of portions of Florida Bay have been cored to develop insights on the paleontology of previous biota.

The bay receives freshwater from two major drainage basins: Shark River Slough and Taylor Slough. The clean freshwater delivered by these sloughs is essential for maintaining water levels and preventing salinity levels from getting too high. The bay currently receives less than half of the freshwater from the sloughs compared to historic, pre-drainage conditions.

Flora and fauna 
The bay's many basins that are broken up by banks serve as plentiful fishing grounds for snook (Centropomus undecimalis), redfish (Sciaenops ocellatus), spotted seatrout (Cynoscion nebulosus), tarpon (Megaflops atlanticus), bonefish (Albula vulpes), and permit (Trichinous falcatus), among others.

The bay is home to many species of wading birds. Most notably, Roseate spoonbills (Platalea ajaja), Reddish egrets (Egretta rufescens), and Great White Herons (Ardea herodias occidentalis) have unique subpopulations that are largely restricted to Florida Bay. Other bird species include Bald eagles, seagulls, pelicans, sandpipers, cormorants, ospreys, and flamingos.

Bay land animals include raccoons, opossums, bobcats, and fox squirrels.

Environmental issues

Florida Bay has undergone a series of ecological changes beginning in the late 1980s that have severely altered the ecosystem. Originally, clean freshwater flowed south through the state into the Florida Bay. To support the state's agricultural water needs, namely for sugar cultivation, the water was rerouted and no longer flows into the Bay, causing numerous and severe environmental issues and loss of native wildlife.

Seagrass die-off

The rerouting of the flow of freshwater to the Bay coupled with periods of drought have caused massive seagrass die-offs. The first major die-off occurred from 1987 to 1991 as thousands of hectares of turtlegrass beds (Thalassia testudinum) were devastated by high levels of toxic dissolved sulfide. 10,000 acres died in the central and western bay, and almost 60,000 additional acres suffered reduced productivity and biomass as a result. Then, following the 2015 drought, extreme temperatures and heightened salinity reduced the amount of oxygen that could remain dissolved in the water, causing periods of anoxia during nighttime and thereby damaging the health of the turtlegrass in the bay. During the summer and fall of 2015, approximately 40,000 acres of seagrass died.

Hyper-salinity
The 2015 drought period of low precipitation combined with high temperatures and calm winds that produced rapid evaporation caused salinity to increase in the semi-enclosed basins in north-central Florida Bay. Without the freshwater, the water has become stagnant and salty with excess nitrogen from the fertilizer. This hyper-salinity contributes to the massive seagrass die-offs and algal blooms, and kills submerged aquatic vegetation.

Algae blooms 
Cyanobacterial harmful algae blooms (also known as blue-green algae) have flourished in the bay due to a variety of environmental stressors: Agricultural fertilizer run-off increases nutrients in the delicately balanced environment and the excess increases the bacteria's rate of growth; The newly hyper-saline environment provides an ideal breeding ground for cyanobacteria; Rafts of dead seagrass floating on the surface of the water as well as decaying on the bay bottom leads to anoxia and in turn, algal blooms.

Blue-green algae causes numerous severe health consequences for the marine ecosystem as well surrounding human populations. Blooms result in reduced dissolved oxygen concentrations, alterations in aquatic food webs, algal scum lining the shores, the production of compounds that cause distasteful drinking water and fish flesh, and the production of toxins severe enough to poison aquatic as well as terrestrial organisms. Blooms have been reported throughout the continental United States, and resulting cyanotoxins have been associated with human and animal illness and death in at least 43 states. Most cyanobacteria produce the neurotoxin beta-N-methylamino-l-alanine (BMAA) that has been implicated as a significant environmental risk in the development of neurodegenerative diseases such as Alzheimer's disease, Parkinson's disease, and amyotrophic lateral sclerosis (ALS). The cyanobacteria has also been linked to liver cancer, chronic fatigue illness, skin rashes, abdominal cramps, nausea, diarrhea and vomiting.

The 2002 algal bloom in the central portion of the Florida Bay was associated with high concentrations of dissolved organic nitrogen and organic phosphorus, whereas the eastern bay regions bloom was associated with high concentration of inorganic nutrients.

Loss of native wildlife 
By the mid 1930s, the three main species of wading birds in the bay (Roseate spoonbills, Reddish egrets, Great herons) were driven to near extinction by human harvesting for food and feathers.

The cyanobacteria create an oxygen-free environment teaming with toxic gases, creating an unsuitable living environment for many marine and terrestrial animal species. As a result, seasons during which algal blooms flourish cause a temporary loss in wildlife.

Spotted seatrout populations in the coasted Everglades are declining. As the second most commonly caught species of fish in the Florida Bay, spotted seatrout comprise a large portion of the fishing industry and are integral to the ecosystem as well as surrounding economy. These environmental conditions are far from ideal for the seatrout and add additional difficulties for the survival of juveniles as well as important prey such as larval shrimp and small fish.

Economy 
The bay is an economic and environmental asset. , the recreational fishing industry in Florida Bay had an estimated value of $7.1 billion, and generated $73 million in federal, state and local taxes annually, while the bay's commercial fishing industry had an estimated value of $400 million, and generated $3 million in taxes.

Water management projects 
Various projects are funded by the government in an attempt to manage the hydrology issues present in the Florida Bay, including the C-111 South Dade, Modified Water Deliveries, and C-111 Spreader Canal Western Project from the Comprehensive Everglades Restoration Plan (CERP). These projects seek to distribute more freshwater into the sloughs but do not deliver additional water to the bay.

References

External links

Bays of Florida on the Gulf of Mexico
Everglades
Intracoastal Waterway
Bodies of water of Miami-Dade County, Florida
Bodies of water of Monroe County, Florida
Everglades National Park